Joseph Dunn (20 September 1925 – December 2005) was a Scottish football player and manager.

References

External links

1925 births
2005 deaths
Date of death missing
Footballers from Glasgow
Association football central defenders
Scottish footballers
Clyde F.C. players
Preston North End F.C. players
Morecambe F.C. players
Scottish Football League players
English Football League players
Scottish football managers
Morecambe F.C. managers